Uncastillo (Aragonese: Uncastiello) is a municipality in the province of Zaragoza, Aragon, eastern Spain. At the 2010 census, it had a population of 781.

Along with Sos d'o Rei Catolico, Exeya d'os Caballers, Sádaba and Tauste, Uncastillo is one of the five towns comprising the comarca of Cinco Villas.

In 1966 Uncastillo was declared a Conjunto Histórico-Artístico. It has several Romanesque buildings, including the parish churches of St. Martin and Santa Maria, and the churches of San Felices, San Andrés and San Juan. Its other landmarks include the castle and palace of Peter IV (14th century).

Twin towns
 Morlaas, France

See also
Cinco Villas
List of municipalities in Zaragoza

References

External links

Ayuntamiento de Uncastillo
 La Lonjeta - Asociación Cultural de Uncastillo
 Uncastillo Foundation
 Uncastillo castle
 Uncastillo Tourism

Municipalities in the Province of Zaragoza
Romanesque architecture in Aragon